The Charles Hampton Tracy House is a historic house in rural Lincoln County, Arkansas.  It is located at 2794 Blair Road (County Road 75), north and a little east of the county seat of Star City.  The single story wood-frame house was built in 1923 by Charles Hampton Tracy, a successful local African-American cotton farmer.  The house is a rare local example of Craftsman/Bungalow style, with exposed rafters under the eaves, a hip roof with a prominent gabled dormer, and a front porch supported by square columns on brick piers.  The house is an emblem of the success of cotton farming in the area in the years before the Second World War, and the success of an African-American farmer despite the difficulties imposed by Jim Crow laws.

The house was listed on the National Register of Historic Places in 2011, and was delisted in 2021.

See also
National Register of Historic Places listings in Lincoln County, Arkansas

References 

Houses on the National Register of Historic Places in Arkansas
Houses completed in 1923
Houses in Lincoln County, Arkansas
National Register of Historic Places in Lincoln County, Arkansas
Former National Register of Historic Places in Arkansas
1923 establishments in Arkansas
American Craftsman architecture in Arkansas
Bungalow architecture in Arkansas
Former buildings and structures in Arkansas